Panovo is a rural locality (a village) in Lyakhovskoye Rural Settlement, Melenkovsky District, Vladimir Oblast, Russia. The population was 481 as of 2010. There are 4 streets.

Geography 
Panovo is located 12 km east of Melenki (the district's administrative centre) by road. Dubtsy is the nearest rural locality.

References 

Rural localities in Melenkovsky District
Melenkovsky Uyezd